2 Coelhos is a 2012 Brazilian action film written and directed by Afonso Poyart. The film features innovations that were not common in Brazilian films, including explosions, animations, elaborate special effects and pop culture references. It was released in Brazil on January 20, 2012.

Plot 
Edgar is arrested for killing a woman and child in a car crash, but is bailed out by state representative Jader Kerleis. After two years on vacation in Miami, Florida, Edgar returns to the city of São Paulo with a plot to pit Jader, infamous for multiple corruption cases, against Maicon, a criminal notorious for bribing influential politicians to keep him free, to bring both of them to justice.

Cast 

 Fernando Alves Pinto as Edgar
 Alessandra Negrini as Julia
 Caco Ciocler as Walter
 Marat Descartes as Maicon
 Roberto Marchese as Jader
 Thaíde as Velinha
 Thogun as Bolinha
 Neco Villa Lobos as Henrique
 Robson Nunes as Cleyton
 Norival Rizzo as Nestor
 Aldine Muller as Sophia
Yoram Blaschkauer as Robério

Music

 Radiohead - "Exit Music (For a Film)"
 Matanza - "Imbecil"
 Tom Waits - "I'm still here"
 Titãs - "Será que é isso que necessito?"
 Thirty Seconds to Mars - "Kings and Queens"
 Lenine - "Paciência"

American remake 
 Tango Pictures bought the rights to remake this film with a title Two Rabbits. The film will be the second project for the development of new production, directed by Andrew Lazar, Christina Lurie and Steven Shainberg. Afonso Poyart says it should take the executive production, but not the direction. Poyart said, "The idea is to make another movie. At the moment, the Tango is hiring writers that will give a new treatment history and acclimation to the American public". The budget of the film should cost between $10 million and 12 million.

References

External links
  
 

Brazilian action films
2012 films
2012 action films
Films set in São Paulo
Films shot in São Paulo
2012 directorial debut films
2010s Portuguese-language films
Films directed by Afonso Poyart